Thayeria is a genus of tetras from the Amazon Basin, and the Approuague and Maroni Rivers in tropical South America. It includes three species, including the blackline penguinfish, T. boehlkei. Members of this genus, among other characteristics, are small, have one lateral black stripe, and have a vesica piscis shape. They are peaceful.

In aquaria 
In captivity this species will live on average 3–5 years with proper  husbandry. They like most tetras and family of Characidae thrive in small shoals of 5 individuals or more. They will often establish a dominance pecking order among the group.

Penguin tetras are commonly found in fish stores and are available from online retailers, they require at least 20 US gallons of swimming area, and will typically grow to around 3 inches.

These fish are known for their atypical swimming position that has them swimming at a slight upright angle, and will inhabit the top and middle regions in their aquarium.

Species
 Thayeria boehlkei S. H. Weitzman, 1957 (blackline penguinfish)
 Thayeria ifati Géry, 1959
 Thayeria obliqua C. H. Eigenmann, 1908 (penguinfish)

Location and habitat
Thayeria inhabits small streams and the margins of smaller rivers in the lowland Amazon basin, where it is part of the highly diverse Neotropical fish fauna.

References

 

Characidae
Taxa named by Carl H. Eigenmann
Fish of South America